Callum Eddie Graham Wilson (born 27 February 1992) is an English professional footballer who plays as a striker for Premier League club Newcastle United and the England national team.

Early life
Wilson was born in Coventry, West Midlands. He is of Jamaican, and Irish descent. He attended President Kennedy School in Coventry.

Club career

Coventry City
Wilson started his career with Coventry City's academy. He made his first-team debut on 12 August 2009 as a substitute in a 1–0 League Cup defeat to Hartlepool United. He signed a professional deal, which saw him stay at the club for a further season, on 16 March 2010. Wilson became the first Coventry City youth teamer to win the national award for apprentice of the month in March 2010.

Wilson made his league debut when he came on as a substitute against Queens Park Rangers in December 2010. He made his first appearance of the 2012–13 season in a 1–0 loss against Carlisle United coming on as a substitute for Carl Baker.

The start of the 2013–14 season saw Wilson establish himself in the starting line-up. Forming strike partnership Leon Clarke, after just 11 league games Wilson had scored 10 goals, topping the League One scoring charts. He finished the season as League One's third-top scorer with 22 goals and also earned himself a place in the League One PFA Team of the Year, despite having spent two months out with a dislocated shoulder in early 2014. Wilson won League One Player of the month award for March, and also won his club's Top Goalscorer award, Player's Player award voted for by his teammates and the Player of the season award voted for by Coventry City fans.

Loans
Wilson joined Conference Premier club Kettering Town on an initial one-month loan at the turn of the year in 2011. His loan was extended to another three months upon completion of his first month. Wilson played 17 games, scoring once.

On 29 December 2011, he was loaned to Conference Premier club Tamworth on a one-month loan. He made his debut for the club in a 2–2 draw with Alfreton Town, where he played the full game. He scored in just his second game for the club with a curling shot in a 2–1 defeat against Wrexham on 14 January. Wilson suffered a fractured foot in his third appearance for the Lambs which saw his short loan spell end.

AFC Bournemouth
On 4 July 2014, Wilson signed for AFC Bournemouth for an undisclosed fee, believed to be in the region of £3 million, after spending five years at Coventry. He scored twice on his debut for the club, in a 4–0 win against Huddersfield Town.

In his first season at the club, Wilson helped them achieve promotion to the Premier League for the first time in the club's history, becoming the team's top scorer for that season in the process, scoring 20 league goals. He was Bournemouth's only player to score in all three domestic competitions, scoring the winning goal in a 2–1 victory against West Bromwich Albion in the fourth round of the League Cup.

On 22 August 2015, Wilson scored his first Premier League goals with a hat-trick against West Ham United. On 26 September 2015, he ruptured the anterior cruciate ligament (ACL) in his right knee in the match against Stoke City and was expected to be out for about six months. Wilson made his return on 9 April 2016 as an injury-time substitute in Bournemouth's 2–1 win away to Aston Villa. He ruptured the anterior cruciate ligament in his left knee on 1 February 2017 and was expected to be out for about six months.

Newcastle United

Wilson signed for Premier League club Newcastle United on 7 September 2020 on a four-year contract for an undisclosed fee, reported by BBC Sport to be around £20 million, making him the third-highest fee paid by Newcastle for a player. He made his debut on 12 September, scoring the first goal in a 2–0 away win against West Ham United. On 30 January 2021, Wilson scored his 50th Premier League goal in a 2–0 victory over Everton.

International career
Wilson was called up to the England U21 squad for the first time in November 2014 for friendly matches against Portugal and France. He made his only appearance on 17 November in the match against France, as a 65th-minute substitute in a 3–2 away defeat.

Wilson was called up to the senior England squad for the first time in November 2018 for a friendly match against the United States and a UEFA Nations League match against Croatia. He made his debut on 15 November when starting against the United States at Wembley Stadium, and scored in the 77th minute of a 3–0 win with a near-post finish. In doing so, he became the first Bournemouth player to score for England.

After a three-year absence, he was named in England's squad for the 2022 FIFA World Cup. Wilson came on as a 76th minute substitute in England's opening match against Iran, assisting Jack Grealish for England's sixth goal in a 6–2 victory.

Personal life
Wilson has a wife, Stacey, and two children.

Career statistics

Club

International

England score listed first, score column indicates score after each Wilson goal

Honours
AFC Bournemouth
Football League Championship: 2014–15

Newcastle United
EFL Cup runner-up: 2022–23

England
UEFA Nations League third place: 2018–19

Individual
PFA Team of the Year: 2013–14 League One
Football League Championship Player of the Month: October 2014
Coventry City Player of the Year: 2013–14
Newcastle United Player of the Year: 2020–21

References

External links

Profile at the Newcastle United F.C. website
Profile at the Football Association website

1992 births
Living people
Footballers from Coventry
English footballers
Association football forwards
Coventry City F.C. players
Kettering Town F.C. players
Tamworth F.C. players
AFC Bournemouth players
Newcastle United F.C. players
English Football League players
National League (English football) players
Premier League players
England under-21 international footballers
England international footballers
2022 FIFA World Cup players
Black British sportsmen
English people of Jamaican descent
English people of Irish descent